Claude Bernard University Lyon 1 (UCBL) is one of the three public universities of Lyon, France. It is named after the French physiologist Claude Bernard and specialises in science and technology, medicine, and sports science. It was established in 1971 by the merger of the 'faculté des sciences de Lyon' with the 'faculté de médecine'.

The main administrative, teaching and research facilities are located in Villeurbanne, with other campuses located in Gerland, Rockefeller, and Laennec in the 8th arrondissement of Lyon. Attached to the university are the Hospices Civils de Lyon, including the 'Centre Hospitalier Lyon-Sud', which is the largest teaching hospital in the Rhône-Alpes region and the second-largest in France.

The university has been independent since January 2009. In 2020 it managed an annual budget of over €420 million and had 2857 faculty.

History
On 17 March 1808, Napoleon I founded the University of France, a national organisation with responsibility for formal education from primary through to university level. This decree created the Academy of Lyon within the University and established the Lyon Faculty of Science. The Lyon Faculty of Medicine was founded on 8 November 1874 and was later merged with the Faculty of Science on 8 December 1970 to create Claude Bernard University.

Locations and buildings

Main sites
The university is not located on a single campus but has departments and other facilities distributed across several key sites throughout Lyon and the wider region. The LyonTech-la Doua campus located north of Villeurbanne and east of Lyon's Parc de la Tête d'Or hosts the administrative headquarters of the university as well as its Faculties of Science and Technology and of Sport Sciences.

A second key site, the Lyon Health East Campus, is located in the eighth arrondissement next to the Edouard Herriot hospital and the Vinatier medical centre. It hosts the Faculty of Odontology and the Lyon East Faculty of Medicine, in addition to several research institutes dedicated to medical and biological sciences.

Areas of study

Natural science
 Biology
 Chemistry and Biochemistry
 Mathematics
 Physics
 Earth science
 Electrical engineering
 Computer science
 Mechanical engineering

Public health
 Medicine
 Pharmacy
 Odontology
 Audiology
 Occupational therapy
 Physiotherapy
 Speech therapy
 Ophthalmology
 Psychomotricity

Other
 Sport (STAPS, "Sciences et Techniques des Activités Physiques et Sportives")
 Observatory of Lyon
 ISFA, Graduate School of Actuarial Studies (ISFA, "Institut de Science Financière et d'Assurances")
 Engineering school École polytechnique universitaire de l'université Lyon-I

Reputation
The university was ranked 9-11 out of universities in France and in the 201-300 band of world universities by Academic Ranking of World Universities 2021.

Notable faculty

Mathematics
 Geneviève Comte-Bellot (born 1929) - physicist
 John Adrian Bondy (born 1942) - mathematician
 Michelle Schatzman (1949-2010) - mathematician
 Jean-Louis Nicolas - number theorist
 Pierre Auger (born 1953) - bio-mathematician
 Fokko du Cloux (1954-2006) - Dutch mathematician and computer scientist
 Christian Krattenthaler (born 1958) - mathematician
 Marta Macho Stadler (born 1962) - Basque mathematician
 Marie-France Sagot - computational biologist
 Isabelle Daniel - mineralogist
 Marivi Fernández-Serra - physicist
 Tuna Altınel (born 1966) - mathematician
 Sylvie Benzoni (born 1967) - mathematician
 Vincent Calvez (born 1981) - mathematician

Medicine
 Antonin Poncet (1849-1913) - surgeon
 Jean-Louis Touraine (born 1945) - professor of medicine
 Gilles Salles - haematologist
 Véronique Trillet-Lenoir (born 1957) - oncologist and politician
 Patrick Froehlich (born 1961) - physician and novelist
 David Servan-Schreiber (1961-2011) - physician and neuroscientist

Notable alumni

Academic
 Cécile Mourer-Chauviré (born 1939) - paleontologist
 Christian Dumas (born 1943) - biologist
 Jean Bellissard (born 1946) - mathematical physicist
 Francis Clarke (born 1948) - mathematician
 Rabesa Zafera Antoine (born 1950) - plant biologist, university president
 Muhammad Baydoun (1952-2022) - Lebanese mathematician and politician
 Jean Decety (born 1960) - neuroscientist
 Uwe Rau - German physicist
 Teresa Torres - Chilean paleontologist
 Raphaèle Herbin - mathematician
 Nouria Salehi - Afghan-Australian nuclear physicist, biophysicist and humanitarian
 Patrick Mehlen (born 1968) - biologist
 Hélène Courtois (born 1970) - astrophysicist
 Catherine Tallon-Baudry - electrophysiologist
 Theodora Hatziioannou - virologist

Sports
 Ahmad Ahmad (born 1959) - Malagasy football manager and politician
 Louisa Cadamuro (born 1967) - professional footballer
 Gwendal Peizerat (born 1972) - ice dancer
 Romain Haguenauer (born 1976) - ice dancing coach
 Assile Toufaily (born 1996) - footballer

Other
 André Vansteenberghe (1906-1984) - physician and member of French resistance
 Alice Vansteenberghe (1908-1991) - physician and member of French resistance
 Sami Khiyami (born 1948) - Syrian engineer and diplomat
 Yasmine Motarjemi (born 1955) - food safety specialist
 Marine Lorphelin (born 1993) - model and beauty pageant title holder

See also
 List of colleges and universities
 List of modern universities in Europe (1801–1945)

References 
 Nataly Mermet, Équation : 40 ans d'innovation à l'Université Claude Bernard Lyon 1, Glénat, 2011.

External links
 

Universities in Auvergne-Rhône-Alpes
Villeurbanne
Bernard University Lyon 1
Buildings and structures in Rhône (department)
Educational institutions established in 1971
1971 establishments in France